Passenger rights are the rights of passengers of public transportation. According to passenger rights regulations, a person may be entitled to compensation in the case of:
 injury or death
 delays
 damage or loss of luggage
 erroneous scheduling information

This covers various means of transportation, including
 airplanes
 trains
 buses
 ferries

Rail transport

European Union 
Train passengers in the European Union are entitled to a 25% refund of the ticket price in the case of delays between 60 and 119 minutes. A delay of 120 minutes or more entitles them to a 50% refund.

United Kingdom 
 20% refund for delays of at least 60 minutes

See also 
 Lost luggage

Bibliography 
 Stephan Keiler: Ansprüche von Fahrgästen im Kraftomnibusverkehr bei Verspätung und Annullierung im Konzept der Europäischen Passagierrechte, in Binder/Eichel (Hg.), Internationale Dimensionen des Wirtschaftsrechts (Nomos 2013).
 Jens Karsten / Christian Schuster-Wolf: Entwicklungen im EU-Passagierrecht 2011-2012 – Teil I, Verbraucher und Recht (VuR) 2012, 463 (PDF; 229 kB); ... - Teil II, VuR 2013, 6.
 Thomas Hilpert: Fahrgastrechte und -pflichten der ÖPNV-Linienverkehre nach dem PBefG. Wissenschaftsverlag, Köln 2012, .
 Henrik Lindemann: Neue Fahrgastrechte im Eisenbahnverkehr, transpress 2011, 10.
 Adolf Rebler: Grundsätze der Haftung bei Unfällen von Fahrgästen in Omnibussen und Straßenbahnen im Linienverkehr, Monatsschrift für Deutsches Recht 2011, 457.
 Hans-Georg Bollweg: Fahrgastrechte im Land- und Luftverkehr. In: Deutscher Verkehrsgerichtstag (Hrsg.): Tagungsband zum 48. Deutschen Verkehrsgerichtstag. Luchterhand, Köln 2010, S. 59 ff.
 Hans-Georg Bollweg: Die Kundenrechte des Flug-, Bahn- und Busverkehrs im Vergleich. Reiserecht aktuell (RRa) 2010, 106.
 Ernst Führich: Reiserecht. Handbuch des Reisevertrags-, Reisevermittlungs-, Reiseversicherungs- und Individualreiserechts. 6. Auflage. C. H. Beck, 2010, .
 Haak: Haftung bei der Personenbeförderung - Rechtliche Entwicklungen im Bereich der internationalen Personenbeförderung, Transportrecht (transpr) 2009, 162.
 Raphael v. Heereman: Referat zum Deutschen Verkehrsgerichtstag zur Verordnung EG Nr. 261/2004 ... In: Deutscher Verkehrsgerichtstag (Hrsg.): Tagungsband zum 48. Deutschen Verkehrsgerichtstag. Luchterhand, Köln 2010, S. 69 ff.
 Henrik Lindemann: Fahrgastrechte im Eisenbahnverkehr. In: Deutscher Verkehrsgerichtstag (Hrsg.): Tagungsband zum 48. Deutschen Verkehrsgerichtstag. Luchterhand, Köln 2010, S. 77 ff.
 Silvia Schattenkirchner: Fahrgastrechte im Land- und Luftverkehr. In: Deutscher Verkehrsgerichtstag (Hrsg.): Tagungsband zum 48. Deutschen Verkehrsgerichtstag. Luchterhand, Köln 2010, S. 92 ff.
 Ronald Schmid / Holger Hopperdietzel: Die Fluggastrechte - eine Momentaufnahme, NJW 2010, 1905.
 Martin Schiefelbusch, Uwe Böhme, Nancy Neugebauer, Michael Pohar: Verbraucherschutz im öffentlichen Verkehr. In: Martin Schiefelbusch, Hans-Liudger Dienel (Hrsg.), Kundeninteressen im öffentlichen Verkehr. Verbraucherschutz und Verbraucherbeteiligung. Erich-Schmidt-Verlag, Berlin 2009, S. 39–124. (Schriftenreihe für Verkehr und Technik).

References

External links 
 fahrgastrechte.info

Public transport